Belionota is a genus of beetles in the family Buprestidae, containing the following species:

 Belionota aenea Deyrolle, 1864
 Belionota bicolor Théry, 1926
 Belionota bonneuilii Deyrolle, 1864
 Belionota bonvouloirii Deyrolle, 1864
 Belionota borneensis Théry, 1929
 Belionota championi Murray, 1862
 Belionota coomani Descarpentries, 1948
 Belionota cribricollis Gestro, 1877
 Belionota cyanipes Obenberger, 1928
 Belionota fallaciosa Deyrolle, 1864
 Belionota francoisi Baudon, 1966
 Belionota fulgidicollis Gestro, 1877
 Belionota gigantea Deyrolle, 1864
 Belionota humeralis Gestro, 1877
 Belionota jakli Barries 2009
 Belionota jakobsoni Obenberger, 1928
 Belionota lacordairei Deyrolle, 1864
 Belionota lineatopennis Solier, 1833
 Belionota luzonica Bellamy, 1991
 Belionota metasticta (Illiger, 1800)
 Belionota mindorensis Kerremans, 1898
 Belionota mniszechii Deyrolle, 1864
 Belionota nicobarica Kerremans, 1895
 Belionota nigrocingulata Kerremans, 1890
 Belionota omissa Schaufuss, 1885
 Belionota prasina (Thunberg, 1789)
 Belionota rondoni Baudon, 1963
 Belionota roonwali Obenberger, 1956
 Belionota rubriventris Fisher, 1922
 Belionota sagittaria Eschscholtz, 1829
 Belionota speculicollis Obenberger, 1928
 Belionota sumptuosa Gory & Laporte, 1838
 Belionota vuillefroyi Deyrolle, 1864
 Belionota woodfordi Waterhouse, 1894

References

Buprestidae genera